Bon Haven, also known as The Cleveland House, was an historic home located in Spartanburg, Spartanburg County, South Carolina.  It was built about 1884, and was a two-story, brick Second Empire style dwelling with 1920s Neo-Classical style additions. It featured a mansard roof, central tower and massive Ionic order columns and portico. Its builder, John B. Cleveland, was a founder and trustee of Converse College, a trustee of Wofford College, and played a role in the establishment of Spartanburg's city school system.  It was listed on the National Register of Historic Places in 1976.

Left to rot by its owner, the property was in a state of despair. A couple from Greenville SC offered to purchase Bon Haven for ~$380,000 and promised to historically restore the property and make it a venue or bed and breakfast. Bon Haven was demolished on September 25, 2017.  It was removed from the National Register in 2020.

2021: Bon Haven Apartments have now been built in place of the Bon Haven Mansion.

References

Houses on the National Register of Historic Places in South Carolina
Second Empire architecture in South Carolina
Neoclassical architecture in South Carolina
Houses completed in 1884
Houses in Spartanburg, South Carolina
National Register of Historic Places in Spartanburg, South Carolina
Former National Register of Historic Places in South Carolina